Janez Zorko (born 1937 in Podgorje ob Sevnični) is a Slovenian sculptor and mountain climber. He attended art school from 1957–1959 in Ljubljana. He moved to Paris, France in 1964, and taught Materials and Technology courses at the University of Paris 1 Pantheon-Sorbonne from 1974–1976. He creates both figurative and abstract sculptures in marble, metal and wood.

He is also a keen mountain climber, and has performed numerous ascents, both solo and with others.

References

1937 births
People from the Municipality of Sevnica
Slovenian mountain climbers
20th-century Slovenian sculptors
20th-century Slovenian male artists
21st-century Slovenian sculptors
Living people
Academic staff of the University of Paris